Killinger is a surname. Notable people with the surname include:

Frans Killinger (1875–1936), Hungarian-born military officer and Suriname police officer who committed the first coup d'etat in Suriname.
Glenn Killinger (1898–1988), American football, basketball, and baseball player, coach, and college athletics administrator
John Weinland Killinger (1824–1896), American politician
Kerry Killinger (born 1949), American businessman
Manfred Freiherr von Killinger (1886–1944), German naval officer, Freikorps leader, military writer and Nazi politician